SIES College of Arts, Science, and Commerce is a Mumbai-based college located in Sion. Established by the South Indian Education Society, the college schools students from class 11 and 12 right up to advanced degrees and has research facilities and is affiliated to the University of Mumbai. SIES has been ranked as the 7th best institute in India & 3rd in Mumbai for its Mass Communication Courses by The India Today.In the recent times college is being building recognized by various bodies as it Won the 2014-15 IMC NATIONAL QUALITY AWARD (Education Category) and Higher Education Forum Awarded "Innovation Award" in Graduate Humanities category on 14 March 2015. Its being reaccredited with 'A' by National Assessment and Accreditation Council with a CGPA score of 3.51 in third cycle of 2015.

History
SIES College of Arts, Science and Commerce is a college in Sion, Mumbai, India, owned and managed by the South Indian Education Society (SIES). Inaugurated on 20 June 1960 by Shri Y. B. Chavan, the first Chief Minister of Maharashtra, with a Satyanarayan Puja followed by felicitation of Teaching Staff, Non-Teaching Staff and Students present during the year 1960-61 and completed its golden jubilee on 20 June 2009. 
It received an "A" grade from NAAC in 2015 with a score of 3.51/4.00.
College celebrated its golden jubilee on 20 June 2009. The College was awarded autonomous status by the University Grants Commission on 1 June 2018 and on 30 June 2018 by the University of Mumbai

Grades and recognition
IMC Bajaj National Quality Award (Education category) 2015
An Award for "Innovation Initiatives" by Higher Education Forum In Graduate Humanities Category.
Best College Award 2010-11,by University of Mumbai.
College received an "A" grade from NAAC in 2015 with a CGPA of 3.51/4.00.,.
Trophy-Best College Magazine
Best College (Clean And Green Environment)
BEQET president Award

Courses

Junior college(MSBSHSE)
F.Y.J.C (Science and Arts)
S.Y.J.C (Science and Arts)

UG Courses
Bachelor of Arts (Politics, Economics, Psychology, Philosophy, English, Hindi, History-Politics, History-Economics, History-Hindi, History-Philosophy, Politics-Economics)
Bachelor of Commerce
Bachelor of Science
Bachelor of Management Studies
Bachelor of Mass Media
Bachelor of Science in Information Technology
Bachelor of Science in Computer Science
Bachelor of Science in Biotechnology
Diploma in Early Childhood Care and Education (DECCEd)

Masters Programmes
Physics
Microbiology
Organic Chemistry
Inorganic Chemistry
Biochemistry
Computer Science
Information Technology
Botany
Zoology
Bio-Technology

Masters programmes by research
Chemistry
Biochemistry
Microbiology
Botany
Zoology

Doctoral programmes
Politics
Zoology
Microbiology
Botany
English
Philosophy

Autonomous Courses
PG Diploma in Counselling
PG Diploma in Special Education (Autonomous)
PG Diploma in Early Childhood Education (Autonomous)
PG Diploma in Guidance and Counselling (Autonomous)

Extra-curricular activities

College festival
"Visions", an inter-collegiate cultural festival of SIES.

ZERO Carbon Foot Print

The college in collaboration with Stree Mukti Sanghatana has started a Green initiative to REDUCE-REUSE-RECYCLE with RESPONSIBILITY. 
College has taken up an Organic Manure production program wherein the food waste from canteen and horticulture waste from College surrounding has now been converted to Organic manure. The program has been initiated from 15 August 2014, and by now the college has converted approximately 2 ½ ton of biodegradable waste and has reaped around 200 kg of wet organic manure. The dry weight accounting up to 120 kg organic manure amounting to Rs. 2500/-.Through this initiative the college has saved this huge quantity of waste from going to dumping ground. Hence it has saved Natural resource and National wealth. 
The same project has been replicated at Kawthewadi, the adopted village at Karjat, Maharashtra. 
College has also initiated e-waste collection and recycling in collaboration with Stree Mukti Sanghatana. This e-waste is one of the most toxic and hazardous waste also responsible for fires at dumping grounds releasing toxic gases. With the help of NSS program the students of the college have till date collected approximately 100 kg of e-waste. Through this initiative college has reached masses and saved toxic and hazardous waste reaching dumping grounds. By saving this e-waste going to dumping ground it has also reduced water and air pollution as these e-waste leaches in water and generates toxic waste.
These are some of the innovative and eco-friendly initiatives that college has started and look forward for plenty more.
In an effort to reduce the carbon footprint the college is going Green.

Library
The Library has seen advances and is being utilised by students pretty well with a wide variety of collection.
In order to know the status of book availability, the library is built with an OPAC system using open source software Koha to see visit the online library
http://libcatsiesw-koha.informaticsglobal.com/cgi-bin/koha/opac-user.pl

Publications
SIES has an official college magazine titled "Dakshinayanam" which was also awarded the Best College Magazine by MU. It also has a BMM department's bi-monthly newsletter named "Skyline". The origin of departmental newsletters was started by the Zoology department under the guidance of Mr. Madhavan Gopalan

Institutes
The college has "SIES Institute for Comprehensive Education" in its campus.
Other sister institutes under the SIES management are;
SIES College of Commerce and Economics
SIES Graduate School of Technology
SIES College of Management Studies
SIES Nerul

Notable alumni
Aruna Sairam
Ganesh-Kumaresh
Hariharan
Naresh Iyer
Shankar Mahadevan
Shreya Ghoshal
Erica Fernandes
Latha Venkatesh - Executive Editor, CNBC.
Varsha Gaikwad
Sudha Menon
Aditya Narayan
Major Ramaswamy Parameshwaran - PVC
Swarna Srikanth - Web Journalist, Free Press Journal
Palak sidhwani - actress

See also
 SIES College of Commerce and Economics
 SIES Nerul

References

External links
 SIES College of Arts, Science, and Commerce

Universities and colleges in Mumbai
1960 establishments in Maharashtra
Educational institutions established in 1960
Colleges in India